Abortion in the Marshall Islands is only legal if the abortion will save the pregnant woman's life. In the Marshall Islands, even if physicians determine an abortion is life-saving for the woman, she must receive consent from her spouse, undergo counseling, and she must sign a form consenting to use family planning services after the medical procedure.

References  

Marshall Islands
Health in the Marshall Islands